Francesco Caruso (born July 16, 1982, in Allentown, Pennsylvania) is an American soccer player who last played for USL Second Division side Harrisburg City Islanders.

Caruso grew up in Pennsylvania, attending Lancaster Catholic High School. He then attended San Diego Mesa College where he played soccer in 2002 and 2003. He then transferred to San Diego State University. Caruso then played for Otago United in the New Zealand Football Championship. In 2006, he returned to the United States and signed with the Harrisburg City Islanders.

References

1982 births
Living people
American expatriate soccer players
American soccer players
Association football forwards
Penn FC players
San Diego Mesa College alumni
San Diego State Aztecs men's soccer players
Soccer players from Pennsylvania
Sportspeople from Allentown, Pennsylvania
USL Second Division players